Silence the Sirens is the second album from Muph & Plutonic and was released on 21 November 2006. The album took 10 months to produce and features guest performances from several Australian MCs and Musicians, including Fatlip (The Pharcyde), Pegz, Urthboy (The Herd), Ivens (Awakenings), Raph Boogie & BVA (Mnemonic Ascent) and Red Ghost. The album is considered a classic in the Australian Hip Hop scene, due its blend of high quality production and polished lyricism. It peaked at No. 11 on the ARIA Urban Album Chart and was featured as Triple Js Album of the Week.

Track listing

 "Intro" – 1:09
 "Walking Tightropes" – 2:55
 "Ain't All Over" – 3:36
 "Leave Your Shoes at the Door" (Featuring Raph & Bva) – 3:47
 "Comfort Zone" – 4:21
 "Goin on Tour" (Featuring Urthboy) – 4:24
 "Voice Box" – 4:13
 "Colour of Fire" – 4:47
 "The Day Off" – 3:19
 "Lost Ones" (Featuring Red Ghost) – 4:12
 "What You See" (Featuring Ivens) – 3:29
 "Silence The Sirens" – 3:25
 "Still Say Sorry Though" – 3:56
 "Pessimists Like To Party Too!!" (Featuring Fatlip & Pegz) – 3:32
 "One Side of the Bed" – 3:09
 "Blinded" – 2:16
 "Nothing's Alright, Everything's Ok" – 3:47

References 

2006 albums
Muph & Plutonic albums
Obese Records albums